Bunker Hill Township is a civil township of Ingham County in the U.S. state of Michigan.  As of the 2020 census, the township population was 1,966.

History
Bunker Hill Township was established in 1839.

Communities
It was founded in 1848.

Geography

A little less than half of the Dansville State Game Area lies in the north portion of the township on the boundary with Ingham Township.

Demographics
As of the census of 2000, there were 1,979 people, 690 households, and 547 families residing in the township. There were 719 housing units at an average density of 21.8 per square mile (8.4/km2). The racial makeup of the township was 97.17% White, 0.30% African American, 0.25% Native American, 0.25% Asian, 0.05% Pacific Islander, 0.76% from other races, and 1.21% from two or more races. Hispanic or Latino of any race were 2.07% of the population. As of November 1, 2009, the supervisor of Bunker Hill Township was Joseph L. Bishop.

There were 690 households, out of which 38.6% had children under the age of 18 living with them, 69.0% were married couples living together, 7.4% had a female householder with no husband present, and 20.6% were non-families. 15.2% of all households were made up of individuals, and 3.9% had someone living alone who was 65 years of age or older.  The average household size was 2.87 and the average family size was 3.23.

In the township the population was spread out, with 28.3% under the age of 18, 7.3% from 18 to 24, 32.2% from 25 to 44, 24.4% from 45 to 64, and 7.8% who were 65 years of age or older.  The median age was 36 years. For every 100 females, there were 113.5 males.  For every 100 females age 18 and over, there were 107.5 males.

The median income for a household in the township was $49,345, and the median income for a family was $53,571. Males had a median income of $39,929 versus $26,932 for females. The per capita income for the township was $19,474.  About 3.5% of families and 5.8% of the population were below the poverty line, including 4.7% of those under age 18 and 1.9% of those age 65 or over.

References

Notes

Sources

External links
Official website

Townships in Michigan
Townships in Ingham County, Michigan
Lansing–East Lansing metropolitan area
1839 establishments in Michigan
Populated places established in 1839